Lunafly (Hangul: 루나플라이; sometimes stylized as LUNAFLY) is a South Korean 2-member group under Nega Network. The members are Yun and Sam. Their fans are called Lukies. They officially debuted on 27 September 2012 with their self-composed song How Nice Would It Be.

Career

Predebut: New group announcement 
On 31 August, label mate Jea, leader of Brown Eyed Girls, tweeted a photo of her and the three Lunafly members on her official Twitter account, along with the caption: “This is BEG’s juniors, Lunafly, who are about to debut soon! Teo, Sam, and Yun. These three are all very good at music! You guys will show them your love, right??”. There was no official debut date announced, nor any information about the group. They got quite a good response from netizens, who hoped that Lunafly would bring the same vocal quality as Brown Eyed Girls.

Following the news, on 6 September, Lunafly released their debut album on iTunes worldwide, called “Super Hero”. It consists of two tracks, which are both in English, with the idea of "allowing international fans to fully appreciate their music".

2012: Debut with How Nice Would It Be, Super Hero, Day by Day 
Prior to the release of their first domestic single album on 27 September, on 26 September, Lunafly released their first music video for their song "How Nice Would It Be". It was said that Nega Network invested 150 million won (~US$134,078) on their outfits, accessories, hair and makeup styling for the music video, which is considered a lot for a rookie group. The debut would only be digital, as they would not have any broadcast activities. They had a positive response from netizens, who said that the group was talented, and gave off an image that contrasted with that of typical Kpop groups.

"How Nice Would It Be" reached 1st on Cyworld‘s music chart.

On 28 September, Lunafly released the music video for the English version of their song "Super Hero". They had already released "Super Hero" on iTunes worldwide on 6 September. Once again, they received a good response from netizens, who commented on the how good their voices are. Shortly after Lunafly announced that they would be holding their first solo concert in Japan.

After announcing that they were gearing up for their second digital single, Lunafly revealed the single's title to be "Clear Day, Cloudy Day", with a scheduled release date of 5 December. This single would be, just like their previous singles, self-composed. Without any TV promotions, Lunafly had already made thousands of fans by promoting on iTunes and with live concerts.

On 1 December, the group made their appearance at Tokyo's FM Hall in Japan, where they successfully concluded their first overseas solo live. Before proceeding with their performances, Lunafly expressed, "We’re very thankful for being able to hold a solo live concert in Japan just two months after our debut and we’re also very nervous. We've prepared a lot." They played a total of six songs for their Japanese fans, and also promised to work hard so they could be more active in Japan.

On 4 December, Lunafly released the music video of second digital single "Clear Day, Cloudy Day". This song was, again, self composed by the members. Rather than a typical love song, "Clear Day, Cloudy Day" delivers a message of hope to those facing difficulties in the current generation. Netizens responded positively, again pointing out the quality of the vocals, and the beauty of the song itself. A lot of fans hoped that they would promote live soon, especially overseas Lukies who had the desire to see them live on broadcasting stations.

On 9 December, Lunafly released the music video for the English version of their song "Day By Day". The song once again displayed the group's talents, as it was composed by the members themselves. "Day By Day" was available on iTunes worldwide a day after the release of the video.

2013: First album Fly To Love, music show debut 
On 7 March, Lunafly announced their official fanbase name, "Lukies". The name was announced through their official Facebook, stating: “The literal meaning of the name LUKIE is ‘Lunafly’s Kingdom is Eternal’, while the hidden meaning is that Lunafly strives to remain humble and hardworking and keep their attitude as they are right now, as rookies in the music industry, even after they become more famous and more well known around the world...”. To decide on the name, a contest was held from 27 February to 5 March, and whoever chose the name ‘LUKIE’ was rewarded with an autographed CD.

On 17 March, Lunafly announced their comeback through their official Facebook. They would be releasing their first album, "Fly To Love", on 3 April. They also released a teaser image featuring all three members. As opposed tho the more serious, monochrome, and simple image they had been giving before, this teaser gave off a more colorful and rock image, with bold colors, bright outfits and the members giving off a playful vibe. Following the full member teaser, they released three more solo teasers for the individual members. They also released a video teaser through their official YouTube account.

On 2 April, the boys released the music video for their title song "Fly To Love", after releasing the full album. The song was, again, composed by the members themselves. The upbeat song expresses the desire to break out from a mundane relationship and go on vacations around the world as a couple. Keeping international fans in mind, the two part album also featured an English version of every Korean track.

They performed their single for the first time at the GOGOS2 club in Hongdae, Seoul later on the same day. International fans were able to watch the full 90 minute live concert on their USTREAM channel. They performed for the first time on a live music broadcast with "Fly To Love" on 4 April, on ‘M! Countdown’, a show that features live performances of K-Pop idols. They also performed their song on ‘Music Bank’ and ‘Inkigayo’, bothsimilar programs. They didn't win any of the performances, but nevertheless the song was still loved by fans all over the globe.

2014–2015: Concerts in Latin America, Europe, Canada and line-up changes 
Lunafly went on a sold out Latin America tour visiting Mexico, Guatemala, Peru, Brazil, and Costa Rica.  This tour was made possible through the partnership with MyMusicTaste (www.mymusictaste.com), a concert crowdfunding platform.  They are currently on a European tour stopping at Portugal, France, Romania, and Italy also crowdfunded through MyMusicTaste.com

It was announced on Lunafly's fan cafe that Teo would be withdrawing from Lunafly and would no longer be participating in Lunafly activities. He now goes under his real name, Shin Tae Ho. Two new members, Jin and Yub,  were added to Lunafly following Teo's departure.

Lunafly Re:Born then performed as 4 in Guatemala and Bolivia, and for the first time in their career, they went to North America to perform in Canada. In as little as 3 years, Lunafly already performed in a total of 32 countries and as of this day, they are the kpop group who performed in the most countries in the Korean music history.

Members 
 Sam Carter – leader, vocals, guitar, violin, composer
 Yun  – vocals, guitar, drums, composer

Past members 
 Teo  – vocals, piano, bass, percussion, composer
 Jin – drummer, composer
 Yub – guitarist, composer

Discography

Studio albums

Extended plays

Singles

Soundtrack appearances

References

External links

 

South Korean boy bands
K-pop music groups
Musical groups established in 2012
2012 establishments in South Korea